Upper Fremont Glacier is in the Fitzpatrick Wilderness of Shoshone National Forest in the U.S. state of Wyoming. This Wind River Range alpine glacier is associated with the largest grouping of glaciers in the U.S. Rocky Mountains and lies on the north slope of Fremont Peak, the third tallest mountain in Wyoming.

Ice core samples were taken from Upper Fremont Glacier in 1990-1991. These ice cores were analyzed for climatic changes as well as alterations of atmospheric chemicals. A linkage was established with a similar ice core study which had been undertaken on the Quelccaya Ice Cap in Peru, which also demonstrated the same changes in the oxygen isotope ratio during the same period. The climatic implications from the ice cores taken from both sites support evidence of a sudden global climate change during the mid 19th century.

Ice cores from the glacier also showed increased levels of Tritium (3H) and chlorine-36 around the year 1963, which coincides with the peak period of above ground nuclear testing.

The same ice cores were also tested for mercury deposition from natural and human-induced activities. This is the first known instance in which ice cores have been used to determine mercury deposition from a mid-latitude glacier in North America, as all previous studies have been derived from other sources. The majority of mercury deposition is by way of the atmosphere and sources of the element may be from volcanic activity or from industrialization, but volcanoes are believed to contribute a small proportion of the mercury. The ice core samples from the Upper Fremont Glacier indicated that levels of mercury increased dramatically during the industrial revolution and have decreased significantly since the mid-1980s. It is believed that the decrease in mercury deposition since the 1980s coincides with the passage of the Clean Air Act.

References

See also
 List of glaciers in the United States

Glaciers of Fremont County, Wyoming
Glaciers of Wyoming
Shoshone National Forest